"Release Me" is a song by Australian singer songwriter Deborah Conway. It was released as the third single from her debut studio album String of Pearls (1991). It peaked at number 58 in Australia in February 1992. In the following month Conway performed it with Vika and Linda at the ARIA Music Awards of 1992. Dan Condon of Double J, in 2019, rated it as one of seven great performances at the ARIA Awards over 33 years.

At the ARIA Music Awards of 1993, the song earned Conway a nomination for ARIA Award for Best Female Artist  but lost out to Lily by Wendy Matthews.

Track listings
 CD/Cassette Single
 "Release Me"	
 "Will You Miss Me When You're Sober" [Recorded For MCM Networking's 'Rocksat']	
 "In April" [Recorded With Shane O'Mara]	
 "Release Me" [Acoustic]

Weekly charts

References

External links

1991 songs
1992 singles
Mushroom Records singles
Songs written by Scott Cutler